The following outline is provided as an overview of and topical guide to the Vietnam War:

Vietnam War – Cold War-era proxy war that occurred in Vietnam, Laos, and Cambodia from 1 November 1955 to the fall of Saigon on 30 April 1975. This war followed the First Indochina War (1946–54) and was fought between North Vietnam—supported by Communist nations such as the Soviet Union and China—and the government of South Vietnam—supported by the United States, South Korea, Australia, New Zealand, Thailand and other anti-communist allies. The Viet Cong (also known as the National Liberation Front, or NLF), a South Vietnamese communist common front, aided by the North, fought a guerrilla war against anti-communist forces in the region. The People's Army of Vietnam, also known as the North Vietnamese Army (NVA), engaged in a more conventional war, at times committing large units to battle.

General history of the Vietnam War 

 Gulf of Tonkin Incident
 Terminology of the Vietnam War
 Legality of the Vietnam War
 Opposition to United States involvement in the Vietnam War
 List of Congressional opponents of the Vietnam War
 Protests against the Vietnam War
 U.S. news media and the Vietnam War
 Vietnam War myths
 Weapons of the Vietnam War
 Landmines in the Vietnam War
 Forward air control during the Vietnam War
 Aftermath of the Vietnam War
 Vietnam War POW/MIA issue
 Australians missing in action in the Vietnam War
 List of Puerto Ricans missing in action in the Vietnam War
 Vietnam War casualties
 List of journalists killed and missing in the Vietnam War

Participants in the Vietnam War

North Vietnam and its allies 

 North Vietnam
 China in the Vietnam War
 Soviet Union (Vietnam War#Soviet Union)
 North Korea

South Vietnam and its allies 

 South Vietnam
 Military history of Australia during the Vietnam War
 Canada and the Vietnam War
 New Zealand in the Vietnam War
 Republic of China in the Vietnam War (Taiwan)
 South Korea in the Vietnam War
 Republic of Korea Armed Forces statistics in the Vietnam War
 Role of the United States in the Vietnam War
 Formations of the United States Army during the Vietnam War

Years in the Vietnam War 

 1940–46 in the Vietnam War
 1947–50 in the Vietnam War
 1954 in the Vietnam War
 1955 in the Vietnam War
 1956 in the Vietnam War
 1957 in the Vietnam War
 1958 in the Vietnam War
 1959 in the Vietnam War
 1960 in the Vietnam War
 1961 in the Vietnam War
 1962 in the Vietnam War
 1963 in the Vietnam War
 1964 in the Vietnam War
 1965 in the Vietnam War
 1966 in the Vietnam War
 1967 in the Vietnam War
 1968 in the Vietnam War
 1969 in the Vietnam War
 1970 in the Vietnam War
 1971 in the Vietnam War
 1972 in the Vietnam War
 1973 in the Vietnam War
 1974 in the Vietnam War
 1975 in the Vietnam War

Military activity during the Vietnam War

Operations during the Vietnam War 
Listed by starting date:

 Operation Chopper — January 12, 1962 - U.S-South Vietnamese victory
 Operation Sunrise — March 22-April 30, 1962 - Unsuccessful, increased support for the Viet Cong

 Operation Quyet Thang 202 —  April 27-May 27, 1964 - South Vietnamese victory
Operation 34A – (1964)
 Operation Starlite — August 18–24, 1965  - Both sides claim victory
Operation Piranha — September 7-10, 1965 - U.S-South Vietnamese victory
 Operation Hump – November 5-8, 1965 - U.S-Australian-New Zealand victory
 Operation Harvest Moon — December 8-20, 1965 - U.S-South Vietnamese victory
Operation Marauder — January 1-8, 1966 - U.S-Australian-New Zealand victory
Operation Crimp – January 8-14, 1966 - U.S-Australian-New Zealand victory
Operation Van Buren — January 15-February 25, 1966 - U.S-South Korean victory
 Operation Masher — January 24-March 6, 1966 - U.S-South Vietnamese-South Korean victory, reportedly 10,000+ civilian casualties
Operation Mastiff — February 21-25, 1966 - Inconclusive, failure to engage North Vietnamese forces
 Operation Birmingham – April 1966- Allied victory
 Operation Crazy Horse -May 16, 1966 - U.S-ARVN-South Korean allies claim victory 
 Operation Hastings – July 15-August 3, 1966 - U.S-ARVN victory
 Operation Prairie – August 1966 - Inconclusive, PAVN avoid destruction
 Operation Thayer - September 13, 1966 - Allied victory
 Operation Deckhouse Five – January 6, 1967 - U.S failure
 Operation Cedar Falls – January 8, 1967 - Inconclusive, VC/NVA defends the Iron Triangle
 Operation Junction City – February 21, 1967 - Minor allied Pyrrhic victory, heavy VC/NVA casualties
 Operation Francis Marion – April 6 – October 11, 1967 - Minor allied Pyrrhic victory, heavy VC/NVA casualties
 Operation Baker – April 17, 1967 - U.S victory
 Operation Union – April 21 – May 16, 1967 - U.S victory
 Operations Malheur I and Malheur II – 11 May – July 1, 1967 - U.S operational victory
 Phoenix Program – 1967–1972 - Counterinsurgency program in SVN, 26,369 suspected VC assassinated
 Operation Speedy Express 1968–1969 - VC claims U.S failure, heavy civilian casualties
 Operation Scotland – See Battle of Khe Sanh
 Operation Pegasus – August 8, 1968
 Operation Dewey Canyon – January 22, 1969 
 Operation Apache Snow – May 10–20, 1969
 Operation Chicago Peak – April 1970
 Operation Texas Star – April – September, 1970
 Operation Ivory Coast – November 21, 1970
 Operation Jefferson Glenn – 1970–1971
 Operation Lam Son 719 – February 8, 1971
 Ho Chi Minh Campaign January 24 – April 30, 1975
 Operation Frequent Wind – April, 1975

Battles of the Vietnam War 
 Battle of Ap Bac – January 2, 1963
 Battle of Kien Long – April 11–15, 1964
 Battle of An Lão – December 7–9, 1964
 Battle of Binh Gia – December 28, 1964 – January 1, 1965
 Battle of Sông Bé – May 10–15, 1965
 Battle of Đồng Xoài – June 10, 1965
 Battle of Ia Drang – November 14–18, 1965
 Battle of Bong Son – January 28, – February 12, 1966
 Battle of A Shau – March 9–10, 1966
 Battle of Xa Cam My – April 11–12, 1966
 Battle of Minh Thanh Road – July 9, 1966
 Battle of Đức Cơ – August 9, 1966
 Battle of Long Tan – August 18, 1966
 Viet Cong attack on Tan Son Nhut Air Base (1966) – December 4, 1966
 Battle of LZ Bird – December 27, 1966
 Battle of Tra Binh Dong – February 14–15, 1967
 Battle of Ap My An – February 17, 1967
 Battle of Con Thien – February 27, 1967 – February 28, 1969
 Battle of Hills 881 and 861 – April 24 – May 9, 1967
 Battle of Ong Thanh – October 17, 1967
 First Battle of Loc Ninh – October 29 – November, 1967
 Battle of Dak To – November 3–22, 1967
 Battle of Tam Quan – December 6–20, 1967
 Battle of Khe Sanh – January 21 – April 8, 1968
 Tet Offensive – January 30 – February 25, 1968
 Battle of Biên Hòa (1968) – January 24 – March 1, 1968
 First Battle of Saigon – January 31, – February 3, 1968
 Battle of Huế – January 31, – February 25, 1968
 Battle of Kham Duc – May 10–12, 1968
 Battle of Coral–Balmoral – May 12 – June 6, 1968
 Tet 1969 – February 1969
 Battle of Hamburger Hill – May 10–20, 1969
 Battle of Binh Ba – June 6–8, 1969
 Battle of Fire Support Base Ripcord – March 12 – July 23, 1970
 Cambodian Campaign – April 29 – July 22, 1970
 Battle of Snuol – January 5 – May 30, 1971
 Battle of Long Khánh – June 6–7, 1971
 Easter Offensive – March 30 – October 22, 1972
 First Battle of Quảng Trị – March 30 – May 1, 1972
 Battle of Loc Ninh – April 4–7, 1972
 Battle of An Lộc – April 20 – July 20, 1972
 Second Battle of Quảng Trị – June 28 – September 16, 1972
 Battle of the Paracel Islands - January 19, 1974
 Battle of Phước Long – December 13, 1974 – January 6, 1975
 Battle of Ban Me Thuot – March 10–12, 1975
 Battle of Xuân Lộc – April 9–20, 1975

Air campaigns of the Vietnam War 
 Operation Farm Gate
 Operation Chopper (1962)
 Operation Ranch Hand (1962–1971)
 Operation Pierce Arrow (1964)
 Operation Barrel Roll (1964–1972)
 Operation Pony Express (1965–1970)
 Operation Flaming Dart (1965)
 Operation Rolling Thunder (1965–1968)
 Operation Steel Tiger (1965–1968)
 Operation Arc Light (1965–1973)
 Operation Tiger Hound (1965–1968)
 Operation Shed Light (1966–1972)
 Operation Carolina Moon (1966)
 Operation Wahiawa (1966)
 Operation Bolo (1967)
 Operation Popeye (1967–1972)
 Operation Niagara (1968)
 Operation Igloo White (1968–1973)
 Operation Giant Lance (1969)
 Operation Commando Hunt (1968–1972)
 Operation Menu (1969–1970)
 Operation Patio (1970)
 Operation Freedom Deal (1970–1973)
 Operation Linebacker (1972)
 Operation Enhance Plus (1972)
 Operation Linebacker II (1972)
 Operation Homecoming (1973)
 Operation Babylift (1975)
 Operation Eagle Pull (1975)
 Operation Frequent Wind (1975)

Military medals

South Vietnam 
 National Order of Vietnam
 Vietnam Military Merit Medal
 Vietnam Distinguished Service Order
 Vietnam Meritorious Service Medal
 Vietnam Special Service Medal
 Vietnam Gallantry Cross
 Vietnam Air Gallantry Cross
 Vietnam Navy Gallantry Cross
 Vietnam Armed Forces Honor Medal
 Vietnam Civil Actions Medal
 Vietnam Staff Service Medal
 Vietnam Technical Service Medal
 Vietnam Wound Medal
 Vietnam Campaign Medal
 Presidential Unit Citation (Vietnam)
 Vietnam Gallantry Cross Unit Citation
 Vietnam Civil Actions Unit Citation

North Vietnam 
 Golden Star Medal
 Ho Chi Minh Order
 Defeat American Aggression Badge
 Vietnam Liberation Order
 Resolution for Victory Order

United States 
 Medal of Honor
 Distinguished Service Cross rare
 Navy Cross uncommon
 Air Force Cross uncommon
 Silver Star uncommon
 Distinguished Flying Cross uncommon
 Air Medal frequent
 Purple Heart frequent
 Bronze Star frequent
 Presidential Unit Citation rare
 Vietnam Service Medal very common
 National Defense Service Medal very common
 Commendation Medal common

Prominent figures of the Vietnam War

South Vietnamese
 Dương Văn Minh
 Trần Văn Hương
 Ngô Đình Diệm
 Ngô Đình Nhu
 Nguyễn Cao Kỳ
 Nguyễn Khánh
 Nguyễn Văn Thiệu
 Ngô Quang Trưởng
 Lê Minh Đảo

American
 Creighton W. Abrams
 Spiro Agnew
 Clark Clifford
 Alexander Haig
 Hubert Humphrey
 Lyndon Johnson
 Henry Kissinger
 Melvin Laird
 Robert McNamara
 Richard Nixon
 Dean Rusk
 John Paul Vann
 William Westmoreland

South Korean
 Park Chung-hee
 Chae Myung-shin

North Vietnamese
 Ho Chi Minh
 Lê Duẩn
 Trần Văn Trà
 Lê Đức Thọ
 Phạm Văn Đồng
 Võ Nguyên Giáp
 Lê Trọng Tấn

Cambodian
 Lon Nol
 Pol Pot
 Norodom Sihanouk
 Sirik Matak
 Sosthene Fernandez

Soviet Union 
 Nikita Khrushchev
 Leonid Brezhnev
 Alexei Kosygin
 Andrei Gromyko
 Rodion Malinovsky
 Andrei Grechko
 Nikolai Sutyagin
 Anastas Mikoyan
 Nikolai Podgorny

China 
 Mao Zedong
 Zhou Enlai
 Chen Yi 
 Ji Pengfei
 Liu Shaoqi
 Lin Biao

Media relating to the Vietnam War

Non-fiction
 David H. Hackworth. 1989 About Face
 A.J. Langguth. 2000. Our Vietnam: the War 1954–1975.
 Mann, Robert. 2002. Grand Delusion, A: America's Descent Into Vietnam.
 Windrow, Martin. 2005. The Last Valley: Dien Bien Phu and the French Defeat in Vietnam.
 Bernard Fall. 1967. Hell in a Very Small Place: the Siege of Dien Bien Phu.
 Harvey Pekar. 2003. American Splendor: Unsung Hero
 Prados, John. 2000. The Blood Road: The Ho Chi Minh Trail and the Vietnam War.
 Prados, John. 1999. Valley of Decision: The Siege of Khe Sanh.
 Shultz, Robert H. Jr. 2000. The Secret War Against Hanoi: The Untold Story of Spies, Saboteurs, and Covert Warriors in North Vietnam.
 Plaster, John L. 1998. SOG: The Secret Wars of America's Commandos in Vietnam.
 Murphy, Edward F. 1995. Dak To: America's Sky Soldiers in South Vietnam's Central Highlands.
 Nolan, Keith W. 1996. The Battle for Saigon: Tet 1968.
 Nolan, Keith W. 1996. Sappers in the Wire: The Life and Death of Firebase Mary Ann.
 Nolan, Keith W. 1992. Operation Buffalo: USMC Fight for the DMZ.
 Nolan, Keith W. 2003. Ripcord : Screaming Eagles Under Siege, Vietnam 1970.
 Robert S. McNamara. 1996. In Retrospect: The Tragedy and Lessons of Vietnam.
 Larry Berman. 2002. No Peace, No Honor: Nixon, Kissinger, and Betrayal in Vietnam.
 Bergerud, Eric M. 1994. Red Thunder, Tropic Lightning: The World of a Combat Division in Vietnam.
 Bernard Edelman. 2002. Dear America: Letters Home from Vietnam.
 Darrel D. Whitcomb. 1999. The Rescue of Bat 21.
 Oberdorfer, Don. 1971. Tet: the Story of a Battle and its Historic Aftermath.
 LTG Harold G. Moore and Joseph L. Galloway. 1992. We Were Soldiers Once ... And Young.
 Duiker, William J. 2002. Ho Chi Minh: A Life.
 John Laurence. 2002. The Cat from Hue: A Vietnam War Story.
 Emerson, Gloria. 1976. Winners and Losers: Battles, Retreats, Gains, Losses and Ruins from a Long War.
 Philip Caputo. 1977. A Rumor of War.
 Al Santoli. 1981. Everything We Had: an Oral History of the Vietnam War by 33 American Soldiers Who Fought It.
 Robert C. Mason. 1983. Chickenhawk.
 Michael Herr. 1977. Dispatches.
 Joseph T. Ward. 1991. Dear Mom: a Sniper's Vietnam.
 Hemphill, Robert. 1998. Platoon: Bravo Company.
 Noam Chomsky. 1967. The Responsibility of Intellectuals.
 Moore, Robin. 1965 The Green Berets
 Tim O'Brien. 1973. If I Die in a Combat Zone, Box Me Up and Send Me Home.
 Frank W. Snepp III. 1977.  Decent Interval: An Insider's Account of Saigon's Indecent End Told by the CIA's Chief Strategy Analyst in Vietnam
 Strunk, John. 2015. "We Walked Across Their Graves" Vietnam 1967-The Que Son Valley
 Hayes, Roger. 2000. On Point

Fiction
 Robert Olen Butler. 1992. A Good Scent from a Strange Mountain
 Nelson Demille. 2002. Up Country.
 Garth Ennis. 2003. The Punisher: Born
 Daniel Ford. 1967. Incident at Muc Wa (filmed 1976 as Go Tell the Spartans).
 Graham Greene. 1955. The Quiet American (filmed 1958, 2002).
 Larry Heinemann. 1986. Paco's Story.
 Gustav Hasford. 1979. The Short-Timers (filmed 1987 as Full Metal Jacket).
 Duong Thu Hương. 2005. No Man's Land.
 Phillip Jennings. 2005. Nam-a-Rama.
 Denis Johnson. 2007. Tree of Smoke.
 Karl Marlantes. 2010. Matterhorn.
 William Pelfrey. 1984. The Big V.
 Stephen King. 1999. Hearts in Atlantis. (filmed 2001 as "Hearts in Atlantis")
 Walter Dean Myers. 1995. Fallen Angels
 Bao Ninh. 1995. The Sorrow of War.
 Tim O'Brien. 1978. Going After Cacciato.
 Tim O'Brien. 1990. The Things They Carried.
 Edward B. Robinson. 2006. The Godhead
 James H. Webb. 1978. Fields of Fire.
 John M. Del Vecchio. 1982. The 13th Valley.
 Wayne Care. 1989. Vietnam Spook Show.Film

Other
 The musical Miss Saigon The straight play Letter from the South The Peking Opera Letter from the South The lianhuanhua Letter from the SouthSee also
Vietnamese boat people
Re-education camp (Vietnam)
 Cold War-era proxy war
 Colonial war
 Guerrilla war
 Insurgency
 Police action
 Second of the Indochina Wars
References

Further reading
 Vaughn Davis Bornet. [1984]. "The Presidency of Lyndon B. Johnson. Lawrence, Kansas: University Press of Kansas. Chapters 3, 4, 11, 14.
 Boyle, Brenda and Jeehyun Lim, eds. 2016. Looking Back on the Vietnam War: Twenty-First-Century Perspectives (Rutgers University Press, 2016). xviii, 204 pp. 
 Phillip Davidson. 1988. Vietnam at War: The History 1946–1975 Daniel Ellsberg. 2002. Secrets: A Memoir of Vietnam and the Pentagon Papers. New York: Viking Press.
 Bob Fink. 1981 Vietnam, A View from the Walls. Detroit: Greenwich Publishing. .
 Frances FitzGerald. 1972. Fire in the Lake: The Vietnamese and the Americans in Vietnam. Boston: Little Brown and Company.
 Felix Greene. 1966. VIETNAM! VIETNAM! IN PHOTOGRAPHS AND TEXT. Palo Alto, California: Fulton Publishing Company, LCCN: 66-28359.
 David Halberstam. 1969. The Best and the Brightest. New York. Ballantine Books.
 Patrick J. Hearden. 1991. The Tragedy of Vietnam New York: Harper Collins.
 George C. Herring. 1979. "America's Longest War: The United States and Vietnam, 1950–1975". Boston: McGraw-Hill.
 Stanley Karnow. 1983. Vietnam, A History. New York: Viking Press, 
 Michael P. Kelley. 2002 Where We Were In Vietnam, 1945–1975. Hellgate Press. 
 Gabriel Kolko. 1994. Anatomy of a War: Vietnam, the United States, and the Modern Historical Experience London: Phoenix Press.
 Guenter Lewy. 1978. America in Vietnam. New York: Oxford University Press.
 Michael Maclear. 1981. Vietnam, The Ten Thousand Day War. London: Mandarin, 
 Robert J. McMahon. 2003. Major Problems in the History of the s relating Vietnam War. New York, Houghton Mifflin Co., 
 Robert McNamara. 1995. In Retrospect: The Tragedy and Lessons of Vietnam. (written with Brian VanDeMark) New York: Vintage Books.
 Robert Mann. 2001. A Grand Delusion: America's Descent into Vietnam. New York: Basic Books.
 Wilbur H. Morrison. 2001. The Elephant and the Tiger. Hellgate Press. 
Mark Moyar. 2006. Triumph Forsaken: The Vietnam War, 1954–1965. Cambridge University Press. .
 Jonathan Neale. 2001. The American War: Vietnam 1960–1975. London: Bookmarks Publications Limited, 
 James S. Olson (editor). 1988. Dictionary of the Vietnam War. New York: Greenwood Press, Inc.
 Gareth Porter, Perils Of Dominance: Imbalance Of Power And The Road To War In Vietnam, University of California Press (June, 2005), hardcover, 403 pages, 
 Robert Schulzinger. 1997. A Time for War: The United States and Vietnam, 1941–1975. New York: Oxford University Press.
 Neil Sheehan. 1988. A Bright Shining Lie. New York: Vintage.
 Lewis Sorley. 1999. A Better War: The Unexamined Victories and Final Tragedy of America's Last Years in Vietnam New York: Harcourt.
 Harry G. Summers. 1982. On Strategy: A Critical Analysis of the Vietnam War. Presidio Press. , 
 Shelby Stanton. 1987. Vietnam: Order of Battle Shelby Stanton. 1988. The Rise and Fall of an American Army Louis A. Wiesner. 1988. Victims and Survivors Displaced Persons and Other War Victims in Viet-Nam''. New York: Greenwood Press.

Vietnam War
Vietnam War
Outline